Nibuwakharka  is a village development committee in Syangja District, Gandaki Zone, Nepal. At the time of the 2011 Nepal census it had a population of 3,875 living in 790 individual households. There are major 9 ward no/villages in this VDC. Magar and Bramhin are the major castes living in this village.

References

External links
UN map of the municipalities of Syangja District

Populated places in Syangja District